The Sunshine Makers is the title of two films:
The Sunshine Makers (1935 film), an animated film
The Sunshine Makers (2015 film), a documentary